The Cavan Junior Football Championship is an annual Gaelic Athletic Association club competition between the third-tier Cavan Gaelic football clubs. It was first competed for in 1913. The winner qualifies to represent their county in the Ulster Club Championship and in turn, go on to the All-Ireland Junior Club Football Championship. The current champions are Templeport St Aidans who defeated Cornafean GFC in the 2015 decider on a scoreline of 1-16 to 1-12.

Format
11 teams will contest the Hotel Kilmore Junior Championship in 2015.

Teams have been drawn into 3 groups, two with 4 team (Group 1 & 2) and one with 3 teams, (Group 3). The group stages will be played on a league basis. Where teams finish on equal points group placings will be decided in accordance with rule 6.20 of the GAA Official Guide 2013.

The top team in each group will qualify for the semi-finals. The runner up of each group will play off, with the winner qualifying for the semi-final.

Semi-final pairings will be based on an open draw.

2015 Championship

Group stage

Group A

Group B

Group C

Semi-final play-off

Semi-finals

Final

References

External links
 Cavan at ClubGAA
 Official Cavan GAA Website

Cavan Junior Football Championship
Cavan GAA Football championships